In glaciology, a roche moutonnée  (or sheepback) is a rock formation created by the passing of a glacier. The passage of glacial ice over underlying bedrock often results in asymmetric erosional forms as a result of abrasion on the "stoss" (upstream) side of the rock and plucking on the "lee" (downstream) side. Some geologists limit the term to features on scales of a metre to several hundred metres and refer to larger features as crag and tail.

Etymology

The 18th-century Alpine explorer Horace-Bénédict de Saussure coined the term Roches moutonnées  in 1786. He saw in these rocks a resemblance to the wigs that were fashionable amongst French gentry in his era and which were smoothed over with mutton fat (hence moutonnée) so as to keep the hair in place. The French term is often incorrectly interpreted as meaning "sheep rock".

Description

The contrasting appearance of the erosional stoss and lee aspects is very defined on roches moutonnées; all the sides and edges have been smoothed and eroded in the direction travelled by the glacier that once passed over it. It is often marked with glacial striations.

The rough and craggy down-ice (leeward) side is formed by plucking or quarrying, an erosional process initiated when ice melts slightly by pressure and seeps into cracks in the rock. When the water refreezes, the rock becomes attached to the glacier. But as the glacier continues its forward progress it subjects the stone to frost shattering, ripping pieces away from the rock formation. Studies show that the plucking of the lee side is a much more significant erosional process than the abrasion of the stoss side.

The side profile of a stoss and lee glaciated, bedrock knob (an erosional feature) is opposite to that of a drumlin (a depositional feature).  In a drumlin, the steep side is facing the approaching glacier, rather than trailing it.

Even larger examples are known from Sweden where they are referred to as flyggbergs. The Swedish flyggbergs have been interpreted by Sten Rudberg and others as reshaped inselbergs. Ice-smoothed bedrock bumps which lack the steep, plucked lee side faces are referred to as whalebacks or rock drumlins.

Prest (1983) specifies a distinction between a glaciated "roches moutonnées surface" and a simple "stoss and lee" glacial feature. He says that the term "roches moutonnées surface" has been abused in the literature in which the term became interchangeable with the term "stoss and lee". He points out that a "roches moutonnées surface" is a continuous bedrock surface having a resemblance to the continuous, wavy or undulating rows of curls seen in French wigs at the time of Horace de Saussure while a simple stoss and lee feature refers only to a bedrock knob having a smooth stoss side and a plucked lee side appearance.

Roches moutonnées may not be entirely glacial landforms, taking most of their shape before glaciation. Jointing that contribute to the shape typically predate glaciation and roches moutonnee-like forms can be found in tropical areas such as East Africa and Australia. Further, at Ivö Klack in Sweden, weathered rock surfaces exposed by kaolin mining resemble roches moutonnées.

See also

References

External links

 A roche moutonnée and perched boulders, northeastern Manitoba, image from Geological Survey of Canada Canadian Landscapes Photo Collection
 A roche moutonnée, northern Abitibi, Québec, image from Geological Survey of Canada Canadian Landscapes Photo Collection
 A roche moutonnée, Melville Peninsula, Nunavut, image from Geological Survey of Canada Canadian Landscapes Photo Collection

Glacial erosion landforms